Fun Tonight may refer to:
 "Fun Tonight", a song by Lady Gaga from the album Chromatica
 "Fun Tonight", a song by the Riverdales from the album Riverdales